Millionaires Mansions was a TV documentary produced by BAFTA-winning Indus Films and shown on British television Channel 4 in 2016.

The documentary followed luxury interior design companies, such as Juliettes Interiors, when working on high-end projects for high net worth individuals and their homes.

Channel 4 original programming
2016 British television series debuts